Van Devanter is a surname. Notable people with the surname include:

Willis Van Devanter (1859–1941), American lawyer and judge
Willis Van Devanter (born 1930), American art appraiser

See also
Van Deventer (disambiguation)

Surnames of Dutch origin